Xerogyra fiorii is a species of air-breathing land snail, a terrestrial pulmonate gastropod mollusk in the family Geomitridae, the hairy snails and their allies.

Distribution

This species occurs in Italy.

References

 Alzona, C. & Alzona Bisacchi, J. (1938). Malacofauna italica. Vol. I., 93-128. Genova. (Quinto al Mare).

fiorii
Gastropods described in 1938